Forecastfox (fix version) is a free WebExtension clone of the proprietary Firefox legacy extension Forecast Weather that has been defunct since 2012.

Forecastfox (fix version) information is provided by AccuWeather and displays a summary of weather forecast for a given location in the toolbar that takes the form of a weather map depicting weather, humidity, dew point, UV index, wind speed, visibility, precipitation, and atmospheric pressure for five days. Hovering over the icons shows temperature and weather, for six days.

References

Google Chrome extensions
Free Firefox WebExtensions